MR-2096 is a relatively weak opioid analgesic. It has an unusual chiral tetrahydrofuran-2-ylmethyl substitution on the nitrogen which determines the character of effects and toxicity, with the (R) enantiomer MR-2096 being an opioid agonist, while the (S) enantiomer MR-2097 has similarly potent opioid antagonist effects. This substitution makes MR 2096 completely synthetic. It does not require the use of any opium derivatives to produce. This mix of activities has made these two enantiomers useful for characterising the binding site of the mu opioid receptor. It was never marketed due to its high toxicity.

See also 
 N-Phenethylnormorphine
 Ro4-1539

References 

4,5-Epoxymorphinans
Phenols
Ketones
Ethers
Mu-opioid receptor agonists
Semisynthetic opioids